
Laguna del Carbón (Spanish for "coal lagoon") is a salt lake in Corpen Aike Department, Santa Cruz Province, Argentina.

As in several other locations in Patagonia, dinosaur fossils have been found in the area.

References

External links

near Puerto san Julián: Laguna del Carbón
Physiognomy of the Santa Cruz Province - Argentine Paleontologic Association
Caroline and Stephen: 7 Lows South America - Laguna del Carbón images

Lakes of Santa Cruz Province, Argentina
Endorheic lakes of South America
Lowest points